General Sir Percy Robert Basil Feilding  (26 June 1827 – 9 January 1904) was a British Army officer.

Military career
Born the son of William Feilding, 7th Earl of Denbigh, Feilding was commissioned as an ensign in the 85th Regiment of Foot (Bucks Volunteers) but transferred shortly afterwards to the Coldstream Guards. He fought in the Crimean War and was appointed a Knight, 5th class of the Order of the Medjidie in March 1858. He became Commander of the Infantry Brigade at Malta in January 1879 and General Officer Commanding South-Eastern District in April 1885.

Personal life 
On 29 April 1862, he married Lady Louisa Isabella Harriet Thynne (1834 – 26 June 1919), daughter of Henry Thynne, 3rd Marquess of Bath. They had six children.

He lived at Broome Park in Betchworth and also resided at 107 Queen's Gate, South Kensington, when he was in London.

References

1827 births
1904 deaths
British Army generals
Knights Commander of the Order of the Bath
King's Shropshire Light Infantry officers
Coldstream Guards officers
Younger sons of earls
Recipients of the Order of the Medjidie, 5th class
British Army personnel of the Crimean War